Ingram or Ingrams is a surname, from the given name Ingram. 
Notable people with the surname include:

A. I. Gordon-Ingram, major in the Korean War, B Company commander in the Battle of Hill 282
Adam Ingram (disambiguation)
Adam Ingram (born 1951), Scottish National Party (SNP) politician and MSP
Adam Ingram (born 1947), British Labour Party politician and MP
Alex Ingram (born 1945), Scottish footballer
Arthur Ingram (disambiguation)
Sir Arthur Ingram (ca.1565–1642) was an English investor, landowner and politician
Arthur Ingram, 3rd Viscount of Irvine (1666–1702), English Member of Parliament and peer
Arthur Ingram, 6th Viscount of Irvine (1689–1736), British landowner and politician
Arthur B. Ingram, 19th century American farmer and politician
Andre Ingram, (born 1985), American professional basketball player
Andrew B. Ingram (1851–1934), Ontario real estate agent and political figure
Barbara Ingram (1947–1994), American R&B singer/songwriter 
Bill Ingram (1898–1943), American college football coach
Brandon Ingram (born 1997), American basketball player
Sir Bruce Sterling Ingram, (1877–1963), British Publishing entrepreneur, philanthropist and editor of The Illustrated London News
Catherine Ingram, American politician
Charles Ingram (disambiguation)
Charles Ingram (1696–1748), British soldier and politician
Charles Ingram, 9th Viscount of Irvine (1727–1778), British courtier and politician, son of the above
Charles Ingram (1833–1868), British doctor of medicine and cricketer
C. A. Ingram (1867–1937), American lawyer and legislator
Charles Ingram, a former British Army major convicted of deception after cheating on Who Wants to Be a Millionaire? (UK game show)
Chris Ingram (born 1976), Welsh footballer
Clara Ingram Judson (1879–1960), American author who wrote over 70 books for children
Cliff Raven Ingram (1932–2001), American artist and tattoo pioneer
Clint Ingram (born 1983), American football player
Colin Ingram (born 1985), South African cricketer
Collingwood Ingram (1880–1981), British planting collector and breeder and author of garden books
Daniel Ingram (born 1975), Canadian composer and songwriter in animation and television
Dan Ingram (1934–2018), American radio disc jockey
David Ingram (disambiguation)
David Ingram (explorer), 16th-century English sailor and explorer
David Ingram (musician), (1948–2005), American musician
David S. Ingram (born 1941), British botanist
Dave Ingram (born 1969), British death metal vocalist
David Bronson Ingram, American businessman and philanthropist
David Bruce Ingram (born 1952), American philosopher
Davina Ingrams, 18th Baroness Darcy de Knayth (1938–2008), British politician and member of the House of Lords
E. Bronson Ingram II (1866–1954), American billionaire heir and business executive
E. Snapper Ingram (1884–1966), served as a Los Angeles City Councilman
Edward (Eddie) Ingram, (1910–1973), Irish cricketer
Erskine B. Ingram (1866–1954), American businessman and philanthropist
Frank Ingram (1907–1985), Canadian ice hockey-player
Frederic B. Ingram, American businessman whose jail sentence for bribery was commuted by President Jimmy Carter, renounced his US citizenship.
Sir Geoffrey Ingram Taylor (1886–1975), British physicist and mathematician
George Ingram, 8th Viscount of Irvine, (1694–1763), English clergyman and peer
George Morby Ingram (1889–1961), Australian recipient of the Victoria Cross
Gordon B. Ingram, designer of the MAC-10 and MAC-11 machine pistols
Harrison Ingram (born 2002), American basketball player
Henry Ingram, 1st Viscount of Irvine, (1640–1666), British peer
Henry Ingram, 7th Viscount of Irvine, (1691–1761), English landowner and politician
Sir Herbert Ingram, (1811–1860), founder of The London Illustrated News and MP for Boston
Cecil W. (Hootie) Ingram, (born 1933), former football player and coach
Isabella Ingram-Seymour-Conway, Marchioness of Hertford (1759–1834), English landowner, courtier and mistress of King George IV
Jack Ingram (disambiguation)
Jack Owen Ingram, (born 1970), country-western singer
Jack Ingram, (1902–1969), American actor, appeared in over 300 films between 1935 and 1966
Jack Ingram, (1936–2021), American former race car driver and champion
Ja'Marcus Ingram (born 1997), American football player
James Ingram (disambiguation)
James Ingram (1774–1850), English academic
James Ingram (born 1928), Australian company director, public servant and diplomat
James Ingram (1952–2019), American R&B singer, songwriter and producer
James Ingram Merrill (James Merrill) (1926–1995), Pulitzer Prize winning American poet
Janaye Michelle Ingram, American beauty queen
Jason Ingram, Christian music producer and songwriter
Jay Ingram (born 1945), Canadian author and broadcaster
Joan Ingram, Scottish journalist and broadcaster
John Ingram (disambiguation)
John Ingram (engineer) (1924–2015), New Zealand engineer and businessman
John Ingram (engraver) (1721–1767 or later), English engraver
John Ingram (martyr) (1565–1594), English Jesuit and martyr
John Ingram (politician) (1929–2013), retired American Democratic politician, attorney, and insurance commissioner
John Ingram (revolutionary) (fl. 1644–1676), leader of Bacon's Rebellion after the death of Nathaniel Bacon
John 'Jack' Ingram (born 1957), professional ice hockey player
John Henry Ingram (1842–1916), English biographer and editor
John Kells Ingram (1823–1907), Irish poet and scholar
John Michael Ingram (1931–2014), British menswear designer and founder of Design Intelligence forecasting agency.
John R. Ingram (businessman) (born 1961/1962), American heir, businessman and philanthropist, Director of the Ingram Micro, Inc.
John W. Ingram (1929–2008), Federal Railroad Administrator of the Chicago, Rock Island and Pacific Railway, 1971–1974
Johnathan Ingram (born 1980), is a former American football offensive lineman
Jonas H. Ingram, officer in the United States Navy during World War I and World War II
Jonathan Ingram, BIM software developer
Julius Ingram (1832–1917), American politician
Lee Royston Ingram, (born 1965), former English cricketer
Lorenzo Ingram, Jamaican cricketer
Luther Ingram (1937–2007), American R&B and soul singer
Keaontay Ingram (born 1999), American football player
Keith Ingram, Arkansas politician
Malcolm Ingram (born 1968), Canadian independent film director
Mark Ingram Sr., former NFL wide receiver with the New York Giants
Mark Ingram II, Heisman Trophy winner and current NFL running back currently with the Houston Texans
Martha Rivers Ingram (born 1935), American billionaire
Mary Ann Ingram, American electrical engineer
Maurice Ingram (1890–1941), British diplomat
Melissa Ingram (born 1985), New Zealand swimming competitor
Nicholas Ingram (Nicholas Lee Ingram), executed  in 1995 in Georgia by the electric chair
Orrin Henry Ingram (1830–1918), American lumber baron and philanthropist.
Orrin H. Ingram II, American businessman and polo player.
Osmond Ingram (Osmond Kelly Ingram) (1887–1917), sailor in the US Navy during World War I who received the Medal of Honor posthumously
Paul Ingram (nuclear disarmament expert), BASIC executive director
Peter Ingram, born 1869), Cricketer
Peter John Ingram, (born 1978), cricketer from New Zealand
Rae Ingram (born 1974), English football defender
Reed Ingram, American politician
Rex Ingram (actor), (1895–1969), American stage, film, and television actor
Rex Ingram (director), (1892–1950), film director, producer, writer and actor
Rich Ingram, 5th Viscount of Irvine, (1688–1721), English peer and politician
Richard Ingrams (born 1937), British journalist, co-founder and second editor of the British satirical magazine Private Eye and editor of The Oldie magazine
Robert R. Ingram (born 1945), recipient of the Medal of Honor
Roger Ingram (born 1957), American musician, author, educator, and designer
Reginald William Thomas "Roy" Ingram, South African boxer who competed in the 1920 and 1924 Summer Olympics
Sam Ingram (born 1985), British paralympic judoka
Sheila Ingram (1957–2020), American sprinter
Takiora Ingram, academic and policy advisor on marine conservation from the Cook Islands
Sir Thomas Ingram (1614–1672), English Royalist politician
Tricia Ingrams (1946–1996), British journalist and interviewer
Vernon Ingram (1924–2006), professor of biology at the MIT who discovered the biochemical cause of sickle cell disease
William Ingram (disambiguation)
William Ayerst Ingram (1855−1913), Scottish landscape and marine painter
William Austin Ingram (1924–2002), former United States federal judge from California
William Ingram (writer) (1930–2013), writer
Sir William Ingram, 1st Baronet (1847–1924), Managing Director of The London Illustrated News and MP for Boston
William E. Ingram Jr. (born 1948), United States Army Lieutenant General and Director of the Army National Guard
William T. Ingram (1913–2001), first President of Memphis Theological Seminary
William Ingram (priest) (1834–1901), priest and Dean of Peterborough
William Ayerst Ingram (1855–1913), British painter and member of the Newlyn School
Bill Ingram, (1898–1943), American college football coach
Billy Ingram, English Footballer in 1890 FA Cup Final
W. K. Ingram, Arkansas politician
William Alfred Ingram (1876–1944), British tennis player 
William Ingram (literature professor), (born 1930), American Professor of Literature
Wally Ingram, American drummer and musician

See also

Viscount of Irvine (or Irwin) and Lord Ingram, Scottish Peerages created 1661 for the Ingram family
Ingram Baronets of Swineshead Abbey, British Baronetcy created 1893
Ingraham (disambiguation), includes a list of people with surname Ingraham
Engram (disambiguation), includes list of people with surname Engram

References

English-language surnames

de:Ingram (Name)#Familienname